The 2022 IIHF Women's World Championship Division III was two international ice hockey tournaments organised by the International Ice Hockey Federation.

The Division III Group A tournament was played in Sofia, Bulgaria, from 4 to 9 April 2022 and the Division III Group B tournament was played in Belgrade, Serbia, from 22 to 25 March 2022.

Belgium won Group A, while Estonia won the Group B tournament and both were promoted.

Group A tournament

Participants

Match officials
Two referees and three linesmen were selected for the tournament.

Standings

Results
All times are local (UTC+3)

Statistics

Scoring leaders
List shows the top skaters sorted by points, then goals.

GP = Games played; G = Goals; A = Assists; Pts = Points; +/− = Plus/Minus; PIM = Penalties in Minutes; POS = Position
Source: IIHF.com

Goaltending leaders
Only the top five goaltenders, based on save percentage, who have played at least 40% of their team's minutes, are included in this list.

TOI = time on ice (minutes:seconds); SA = shots against; GA = goals against; GAA = goals against average; Sv% = save percentage; SO = shutouts
Source: IIHF.com

Awards

Group B tournament

Participants

Standings

Results
All times are local (UTC+1)

Statistics

Scoring leaders
List shows the top skaters sorted by points, then goals.

GP = Games played; G = Goals; A = Assists; Pts = Points; +/− = Plus/Minus; PIM = Penalties in Minutes; POS = Position
Source: IIHF.com

Goaltending leaders
Only the top five goaltenders, based on save percentage, who have played at least 40% of their team's minutes, are included in this list.

TOI = time on ice (minutes:seconds); SA = shots against; GA = goals against; GAA = goals against average; Sv% = save percentage; SO = shutouts
Source: IIHF.com

Awards

References

2022
Division III
International ice hockey competitions hosted by Bulgaria
International ice hockey competitions hosted by Serbia
IIHF
IIHF
IIHF
IIHF
Sports events affected by the 2022 Russian invasion of Ukraine